Marge Piercy (born March 31, 1936) is an American progressive activist and writer. Her work includes Woman on the Edge of Time; He, She and It, which won the 1993 Arthur C. Clarke Award; and Gone to Soldiers, a New York Times Best Seller and a sweeping historical novel set during World War II. Piercy's work is rooted in her Jewish heritage, Communist social and political activism, and feminist ideals.

Life

Family and early life 
Marge Piercy was born in Detroit, Michigan to Bert (Bunnin) Piercy and Robert Piercy. While her father was non-religious from a Presbyterian background, she was raised Jewish by her mother and her Orthodox Jewish maternal grandmother, who gave Piercy the Hebrew name of Marah.

On her childhood and Jewish identity, Piercy said: "Jews and blacks were always lumped together when I grew up. I didn’t grow up 'white.' Jews weren't white. My first boyfriend was black. I didn't find out I was white until we spent time in Baltimore and I went to a segregated high school. I can't express how weird it was. Then I just figured they didn't know I was Jewish."

An indifferent student in her early childhood, Piercy developed a love of books when she came down with the German measles and rheumatic fever in her mid-childhood and could do little but read. "It taught me that there's a different world there, that there were all these horizons that were quite different from what I could see".

Education 
Upon graduation from Mackenzie High School, Piercy became the first in her family to attend college, studying at the University of Michigan where she received a B.A. degree in 1957. Winning a Hopwood Award for Poetry and Fiction (1957) enabled her to finish college and spend some time in France. She earned an M.A. from Northwestern University in 1958.

Adulthood 
After graduating college, Piercy and her first husband went to France, then returned to the United States. They divorced when Piercy was 23. Living in Chicago, she supported herself working various part-time jobs while unsuccessfully trying to get her novels published. It was during this time that Piercy realized she wanted to write fiction that focused on politics, feminism, and working-class people. After her second marriage, Piercy became involved in the organization Students for a Democratic Society. In 1968, Piercy's first book of poetry, Breaking Camp, was published, and her first novel was accepted for publication that same year.

Personal life and relationships 
At a young age Marge Piercy was married to her first husband, a French Jewish physicist. However, the marriage failed when she was 23; Piercy attributes this to his expectations of gender roles in marriage. In 1962 she married her second husband, Robert Shapiro, a computer scientist. They divorced, and Piercy married her current husband, Ira Wood. She and her husband live in Wellfleet, MA. Piercy designed their home, where the couple have been living since the 1970s.

Activism
Piercy was involved in the civil rights movement, New Left, and Students for a Democratic Society. She is a feminist, environmentalist, marxist, social, and anti-war activist.

In 1977, Piercy became an associate of the Women's Institute for Freedom of the Press (WIFP), an American nonprofit publishing organization that works to increase communication between women and connect the public with forms of women-based media.

Writing

Piercy is the author of more than seventeen volumes of poems, among them The Moon Is Always Female (1980, considered a feminist classic) and The Art of Blessing the Day (1999). She has published fifteen novels, one play (The Last White Class, co-authored with her current—and third—husband Ira Wood), one collection of essays (Parti-colored Blocks for a Quilt), one non-fiction book, and one memoir. She contributed the pieces "The Grand Coolie Damn" and "Song of the Fucked Duck" to the celebrated anthology Sisterhood Is Powerful: An Anthology of Writings from The Women's Liberation Movement, edited by Robin Morgan.

Her novels and poetry often focus on feminist or social concerns, although her settings vary. While Body of Glass (published in the United States as He, She and It) is a science fiction novel that won the Arthur C. Clarke Award, City of Darkness, City of Light is set during the French Revolution. Other novels, such as Summer People and The Longings of Women are set during modern times. All of her books share a focus on women's lives.

Woman on the Edge of Time (1976) mixes a time travel story with issues of social justice, feminism, and the treatment of the mentally ill. This novel is considered a classic of utopian "speculative" science fiction as well as a feminist classic. William Gibson has credited Woman on the Edge of Time as the birthplace of Cyberpunk, as Piercy mentions in an introduction to Body of Glass. Body of Glass (He, She and It, 1991) itself postulates an environmentally ruined world dominated by sprawling mega-cities and a futuristic version of the Internet, through which Piercy weaves elements of Jewish mysticism and the legend of the Golem, although a key story element is the main character's attempts to regain custody of her young son.

Many of Piercy's novels tell their stories from the viewpoints of multiple characters, often including a first-person voice among numerous third-person narratives. Her World War II historical novel, Gone to Soldiers (1987) follows the lives of nine major characters in the United States, Europe and Asia. The first-person account in Gone to Soldiers is the diary of French teenager Jacqueline Levy-Monot, who is also followed in the third person after her capture by the Nazis.

Piercy's poetry tends to be highly personal free verse and often centered on feminist and social issues. Her work shows commitment to social change—what she might call, in Judaic terms, tikkun olam, or the repair of the world. It is rooted in story, the wheel of the Jewish year, and a range of landscapes and settings.

Piercy contributed poems to the journal Kalliope: A Journal of Women's Art and Literature. Piercy also contributed to the collection of essays by women leaders in the climate movement, All We Can Save.

Works

Novels
 Going Down Fast, 1969
 Dance The Eagle To Sleep, 1970
 Small Changes, 1973
 Woman on the Edge of Time, 1976
 The High Cost of Living, 1978
 Vida, 1979
 Braided Lives, 1982
 Fly Away Home, 1985
 Gone To Soldiers, 1987
 Summer People, 1989
 He, She And It (aka Body of Glass), 1991
 The Longings of Women, 1994
 City of Darkness, City of Light, 1996
 Storm Tide, 1998 (with Ira Wood)
 Three Women, 1999
 The Third Child, 2003
 Sex Wars, 2005

Short stories
 The Cost of Lunch, Etc., 2014

Poetry collections
 Breaking Camp, 1968
 Hard Loving, 1969
 "Barbie Doll", 1973
 4-Telling (with Emmett Jarrett, Dick Lourie, Robert Hershon), 1971
 To Be of Use, 1973
 Living in the Open, 1976
 The Twelve-Spoked Wheel Flashing, 1978
 The Moon is Always Female, 1980
 Circles on the Water, Selected Poems, 1982
 Stone, Paper, Knife, 1983
 My Mother's Body, 1985
 Available Light, 1988
 Early Ripening: American Women's Poetry Now (ed.), 1988; 1993
 Mars and her Children, 1992
 What are Big Girls Made Of, 1997
 Early Grrrl, 1999.
 The Art of Blessing the Day: Poems With a Jewish Theme, 1999
 Colours Passing Through Us, 2003
 The Hunger Moon: New and Selected Poems, 1980-2010, 2012
 Made in Detroit, 2015
 On the Way Out, Turn Off the Light, 2020

Collected other 
 "The Grand Coolie Damn" and "Song of the fucked duck" in Sisterhood is Powerful: An Anthology of Writings From The Women's Liberation Movement, 1970, edited by Robin Morgan
 The Last White Class, (play co-authored with Ira Wood), 1979
 Parti-Colored Blocks For a Quilt, (essays), 1982
 The Earth Shines Secretly: A book of Days, (daybook calendar), 1990
 So You Want to Write, (non-fiction), 2001
 Sleeping with Cats, (memoir), 2002
 My Life, My Body (Outspoken Authors), (essays, poems & memoir), 2015

Awards and honors 

 Arthur C. Clarke Award for science fiction, 1992
 Bradley Award, New England Poetry Club, 1992
 Brit ha-Dorot Award, Shalom Center, 1992
 May Sarton Award, New England Poetry Club, 1991
 Golden Rose Poetry Prize, New England Poetry Club, 1990
 Carolyn Kizer Poetry Prize, 1986, 1990
 National Endowment for the Arts award, 1978
 Honorary Doctor of Humane Letters degree from the Hebrew Union College, Cincinnati, Ohio, 2004

References

External links

 
 Piercy in conversation with Martin Espada May 20, 2009 from Lannan (audio file)
 Marge Piercy  at womenshistory.about.com
 Marge Piercy in Jewish Women: A Comprehensive Historical Encyclopedia at Jewish Women's Archive
 
 Biography from Fooling With Words with Bill Moyers on PBS
 Marge Piercy papers at the University of Michigan
 
 

Living people
1936 births
People from Wellfleet, Massachusetts
Writers from Detroit
Novelists from Massachusetts
University of Michigan alumni
Northwestern University alumni
20th-century American novelists
21st-century American novelists
American women poets
American women novelists
Jewish American novelists
American science fiction writers
20th-century American poets
American feminist writers
Women science fiction and fantasy writers
21st-century American poets
20th-century American women writers
21st-century American women writers
American memoirists
American women memoirists
Novelists from Michigan
Jewish women writers
Jewish activists
Jewish feminists
Jewish American poets
20th-century American non-fiction writers
21st-century American non-fiction writers
Hopwood Award winners
21st-century American Jews